Reidy may refer to:
Affonso Eduardo Reidy (1909–1964), Brazilian architect
Bill Reidy (1873–1915), American basketball player
Brendan Reidy (born 1968), New Zealand-Samoan rugby player
Brian Reidy (1939–2016), New Zealand rugby player
Carolyn Reidy (1949–2020), American publisher
Denis Reidy, Irish football player
Ger Reidy (born 1986), Irish football player
James Reidy (1890–1963), Irish politician
John Reidy (1875–1910), Irish hurler
Liam Reidy (1924–2007), Irish hurler
Mary Reidy (1880–1977), New Zealand nurse
Mike Reidy (born 1991), American soccer player
Norm Reidy (1924–2002), Australian football player
Pádraig Reidy (born 1986), Irish football player
Peter Reidy (c.1874–1932), Australian politician
Ray Reidy (1937–2015), Irish hurler
Sean Reidy (born 1989), New Zealand rugby player

See also 
Reid
Riedy